Tami Hetke (born September 29, 1970) is an American paracanoeist who has competed since the late 2000s. She won a silver medal in the V-1 200 m LTA, TA, A event at the 2010 ICF Canoe Sprint World Championships in Poznań.

References
 
 

1970 births
Living people
American female canoeists
Paracanoeists of the United States
LTA classification paracanoeists
ICF Canoe Sprint World Championships medalists in paracanoe
21st-century American women